Frassinetto is a comune (municipality) in the Metropolitan City of Turin in the Italian region Piedmont, located about  north of Turin.   
Frassinetto borders the following municipalities: Traversella, Ingria, Pont Canavese, Borgiallo, Castelnuovo Nigra, and Chiesanuova.

References

Cities and towns in Piedmont
Canavese